DDR or ddr may refer to:

ddr, ISO 639-3 code for the Dhudhuroa language
DDr., title for a double doctorate in Germany
DDR, station code for Dadar railway station, Mumbai, India
 (German Democratic Republic), official name of the former East Germany
Dance Dance Revolution, a musical video game series produced by Konami
Double data rate, a data transfer strategy of a computer bus
DDR SDRAM, a computer memory standard that uses double-data-rate transfers
Developers Diversified Reality and DDR Corp., former names for SITE Centers Corp.
Disarmament, demobilization and reintegration, a component of peace processes
DNA-damage response, for repairing damaged DNA